Roman (Robert) Vasilievich Crown; (near Perth, Scotland –  1841, Saint Petersburg) was a navy officer in British and Russian service. In the later he eventually became an Admiral and served in the Russo-Swedish War and the Napoleonic Wars.

Life

Early naval Career in British Service
Robert Crown came from a family of Scottish tenants said to have been related to the Gregor clan. He began his maritime service with the Merchant Navy, joined the British Royal Navy (as a navigator, on the frigate Odeon, in squadrons under Admiral Edward Vernon in India about 1778)  and participated in the American Revolutionary War. In early 1788 he became an officer in the Imperial Russian Navy, keeping his rank of a Lieutenant.

Career in the Russian-Swedish war
Already on 10 March 1788 Crown was promoted to Captain-Lieutenant and appointed commander of the 22-gun cutter Merkuriy, which was part of the Baltic fleet squadron Copenhagen. On this ship, Captain Crown carried out patrol services during the Russian-Swedish war in the Baltic Sea. His most important success was the capture of the Swedish 44-gun frigate Venus in the fjord of Christiania on 21 May 1789. Crown was promoted to 2nd rank captain and awarded the Order of St. George 4th class. He received command over the Venus and led it in the battle of Reval and in the battle of Vyborg Bay in 1790. In the course of the latter he captured the ship of the line "Rättvisan" (Justice, built 1783). In recognition of his merits, he was awarded the Order of Saint Vladimir 3rd class and promoted to 1st rank captain (Captain-Commodore). In 1791 Crown, together with many other naval officers of British origin, was transferred to the Black Sea in expectation of war with England.

Promoted to Vice-Admiral and later fate
During the war of the 2nd anti-French coalition, Crown took part in the attempted Anglo-Russian invasion of the Netherlands. He was appointed Rear Admiral in January 1799, while on the 66-gun ship Izyaslav serving in the Baltic, and Vice Admiral in February 1804. In the years 1802-1804 he was in the Baltic fleet on the 74-gun ship Yaroslav. After resting ashore in 1805–1807, he went into a transient retirement on account of the state of war between Russia and England in the years 1808–1812.

In 1812 he led a Russian squadron with six ships from Arkhangelsk to Great Britain and was involved in the blockade of France. In 1814 he was blockading the Dutch coast together with an English squadron, and after the Bourbon Restoration, he transported King Louis XVIII from London to France on board his flagship.
After the Napoleonic Wars, he returned to the Baltic fleet. On 8 February 1824 he was promoted to full admiral. He retired in 1831 and took residence permanently in St. Petersburg, where he died 10 years later.

Family
Crown was married three times, first in 1775 to Sarah Primrose (1759-1780), second to Martha Knight (1754-1839). He had several children from the second, and one son from the third marriage. Two of his sons with Martha Knight became Russian Vice-admirals in the 1870s, i.e. Alexander Egorovich (Malclein Alexander Crown; 1823-1900) and Thomas Yegorovich (Thomas Frederick; 1826-1893).

Citations

References
 Bruzelius, Lars (1996). Information on crown on bruzelius.info, Retrieved on 17 February 2020
 А. Горшман: Кроун, Роман (Роберт) Васильевич, адмирал. Фундаментальная электронная библиотека (A. Gorszman: Kroun, Roman (Robert) Wasiliewicz, admirał. Fundamientalnaja eliektronnaja bibliotieka)
 М. А. Михайпов, М. А. Баскаков: Фрегаты, крейсера, пинейные корабли (M. A. Michajłow, M. A. Baskakow: Friegaty, kriejsiera, liniejnyje korabli). Moskwa: 1986.
 Povarov, Vladislav (2005). Владислав Поваров: Первые годы жизни адмирала Романа Васильевича Кроуна (Władisław Powarow: Pierwyje gody żizni admirała Romana Wasiliewicza Krouna) Information on proza.ru/2005/08/13-237, Retrieved on 17 February 2020
 Contemporary gouache miniature with Crown's portrait in the Royal Museums Greenwich. Retrieved on 18 February 2020

1753 births
1841 deaths
Russian people of Scottish descent
Imperial Russian Navy admirals
Russian commanders of the Napoleonic Wars
Recipients of the Order of St. George of the Fourth Degree
Recipients of the Order of St. Vladimir, 3rd class
Royal Navy personnel of the American Revolutionary War
Royal Navy officers
Russian military personnel of the Russo-Swedish War (1788–1790)
Military personnel from Perth, Scotland